Seeleiten-Berggeist station is a railway station in the municipality of Murnau am Staffelsee, in Bavaria, Germany. It is located on the Ammergau Railway of Deutsche Bahn.

Services
 the following services stop at Seeleiten-Berggeist:

References

External links
 
 Seeleiten-Berggeist layout 
 

Railway stations in Bavaria
Buildings and structures in Garmisch-Partenkirchen (district)